Azanide is the IUPAC-sanctioned name for the anion . The anion  is the conjugate base of ammonia, so it is formed by the self-ionization of ammonia. It is produced by deprotonation of ammonia, usually with strong bases or an alkali metal. Azanide has a H–N–H bond angle of 104.5°.

Alkali metal derivatives
The alkali metal derivatives are best known, although usually referred to as alkali metal amides. Examples include lithium amide, sodium amide, and potassium amide. These salt-like solids are produced by treating liquid ammonia with strong bases or directly with the alkali metals (blue liquid ammonia solutions due to the solvated electron):

, where M = Li, Na, K

Silver(I) amide is prepared similarly.

Transition metal complexes of the amido ligand are often produced by salt metathesis reaction or by deprotonation of metal ammine complexes.

References

Anions
Nitrogen hydrides